Seshadripura is a prime locality. residential and commercial locality in the central part of the city of Bangalore, India. It is named after  K. Seshadri Iyer, who was a Dewan of Mysore State. It is also famous for its colleges. Some of the main colleges are the Seshadripuram Educational Institutions

The locality is bordered by Palace Guttahalli, Vasanth Nagar and Malleswaram.

Neighbourhoods in Bangalore